Phyllomacromia aureozona is a species of dragonfly in the family Corduliidae. It is found in the Republic of the Congo, the Democratic Republic of the Congo, Uganda, and Zambia. Its natural habitats are subtropical or tropical moist lowland forests and rivers.

References

Corduliidae
Taxonomy articles created by Polbot